Rear Admiral Reginald Maurice James Hutton  & Two Bars (28 September 1899 – 18 January 1973) was a Royal Navy officer. He participated in the Battle of Jutland during the First World War and was awarded the Distinguished Service Order and two Bars during the Second World War.

His son, Anthony Hutton, also had a distinguished naval career.

References

External links
http://woottonbridgeiow.org.uk/huttonr.php
http://thepeerage.com/p17115.htm
http://www.unithistories.com/officers/RN_officersH7.html

1899 births
1973 deaths
Commanders of the Order of the British Empire
Companions of the Distinguished Service Order
Companions of the Order of the Bath
Recipients of the King Haakon VII Freedom Cross
Royal Navy rear admirals
Royal Navy officers of World War I
Royal Navy officers of World War II